Q106 may refer to:

WWQM-FM in Middleton, Wisconsin
WJXQ in Charlotte, Michigan
WHDQ in Claremont, New Hampshire
KQXL-FM in Baton Rouge, Louisiana
WQCB in Brewer, Maine
KCQQ in Davenport, Iowa
KLNV in San Diego, California, formerly known as "Q106"
KOOC in Temple, Texas, formerly known as "Q106"
KOQL in Ashland, Missouri
KQPM in Ukiah, California
KRZY-FM in Albuquerque, New Mexico, formerly known as "Q106" 
WQBZ in Macon, Georgia, formerly known as “Q106”, now known as “Q106.3”
WQRL in Marion, Illinois
KQDI-FM in Great Falls, Montana
Six FM in Northern Ireland
Quran 106, the 106th chapter of the Quran